Salvatore Michael Frelick (born April 19, 2000) is an American professional baseball outfielder in the Milwaukee Brewers organization. He played college baseball for the Boston College Eagles.

Amateur career
Frelick grew up in Lexington, Massachusetts and attended Lexington High School, where he played football, hockey and baseball. He was the starting quarterback at Lexington High and was named the Gatorade State Player of the Year as a senior after passing for 30 touchdowns. He committed to play college baseball at Boston College, where he was also offered a football scholarship.

As a freshman at Boston College, Frelick was named Second Team All-Atlantic Coast Conference (ACC) and to the ACC All-Freshman Team after batting .367 with four home runs, 32 RBIs, 30 runs scored and 18 stolen bases. He batted .241 with 17 runs scored and seven stolen bases in 15 games before his sophomore season was cut short due to the coronavirus pandemic. As a junior, Frelick batted .359 with a .443 on-base percentage, six home runs, 27 RBIs, and 17 doubles and was named first team All-ACC and the ACC Defensive Player of the Year.

Professional career
The Milwaukee Brewers selected Frelick in the first round, with the 15th overall selection, of the 2021 Major League Baseball draft. He signed with the Brewers on July 20, 2021, for a $4 million signing bonus. 

Frelick was assigned to the Rookie-level Arizona Complex League Brewers to start his professional career, where he had seven hits over 15 at bats with four runs scored, four RBIs, and three stolen bases in four games before being promoted to the Low-A Carolina Mudcats. He was promoted again to the High-A Wisconsin Timber Rattlers after batting .437 with 31 hits and one home run in 16 games played in Carolina. He ended the season with Wisconsin batting .167 over 15 games. Frelick began the 2022 season with Wisconsin, where he batted .291 in 21 games before being promoted to the Double-A Biloxi Shuckers. He batted .317 with five home runs, 25 RBIs, and 40 runs scored in 52 games with the Shuckers before being promoted a second time to the Triple-A Nashville Sounds.

References

External links

Boston College Eagles bio

Boston College Eagles baseball players
Baseball players from Massachusetts
Baseball outfielders
Living people
2000 births
Arizona Complex League Brewers players
Carolina Mudcats players
People from Lexington, Massachusetts
Wisconsin Timber Rattlers players
Biloxi Shuckers players
Nashville Sounds players
2023 World Baseball Classic players